The Indian locomotive class WU was a class of  steam locomotives used on  broad gauge lines in India.

The four members of the class were built by Vulcan Foundry in Newton-le-Willows, Lancashire, England, to an order placed by the East Indian Railway (EIR) in 1940.  They were completed in 1943.

Proposals were later made for additional members of the class WU to be built.  However, the class lacked the ability to cope with post-World War II traffic, and therefore the proposals were never realised.

See also

Rail transport in India#History
Indian Railways
Locomotives of India
Rail transport in India

References

Notes

Bibliography

Railway locomotives introduced in 1943
WU
Vulcan Foundry locomotives
2-4-2T locomotives
5 ft 6 in gauge locomotives
Scrapped locomotives